Dog Key Island (also known as the Isle of Caprice) is a former barrier island on the Gulf Coast of the United States, between Ship Island and Horn Island among the Mississippi–Alabama barrier islands, and off Biloxi, Mississippi. It has been reported as an island occasionally — in the mid-19th century and the early 20th — while at other times it was submerged. As of 2011 it was a few feet underwater, and NOAA has marked two nautical passes, "Little Dog Keys" and "Dog Keys", next to it.

History
The shoals between Ship Island and Horn Island have intermittently formed small islands known as the Dog Keys, which have been mapped at various dates between 1848 and 1940. Several smaller shoals grew together into one larger island around the beginning of the 20th century, appearing on a 1917 map from the United States Coast and Geodetic Survey. As it stood partly off the territorial waters border of the United States, it was at times used for businesses illegal in Mississippi. Bootleggers used the island and its fresh water during prohibition. More famously, in 1926 three partners opened the Isle of Caprice cabanas hotel, a casino resort where alcoholic drink could be sold openly. The place was very popular, but after continued natural erosion and a hurricane that diminished the sandy island, in 1932 it was abandoned. It lends its name to the Isle of Capri Casinos chain, the first of which was set in Biloxi.

References

External links
 "Isle of Caprice, in the Gulf of Mexico, Twelve miles off Biloxi, Miss.", postcard, date unknown
"Start of the Biloxi - Isle of Caprice Swimming Marathon Biloxi, Miss.", postcard, date unknown
Rucker, J. B., and Snowden, J. O., 1988, "Recent morphologic changes at Dog Key Pass, Mississippi; the formation and disappearance of the Isle of Caprice", Transactions of the Gulf Coast Association of Geological Societies, v. 38, p. 343-349. 

Gulf Coast of the United States
Former islands of the United States
Barrier islands of Mississippi
Hotels in Mississippi
Beaches of Mississippi